"Baby's Got a Hold on Me" is a song written by Jeff Hanna, Bob Carpenter and Josh Leo, and recorded by American country music group Nitty Gritty Dirt Band.  It was released in March 1987 as the first single from the album Hold On.  The song reached number 2 on the Billboard Hot Country Singles & Tracks chart.

Charts

References

1987 singles
1987 songs
Nitty Gritty Dirt Band songs
Songs written by Josh Leo
Song recordings produced by Josh Leo
Warner Records singles
Songs written by Jeff Hanna